George Grech is the former Police Commissioner of Malta.

References 

Living people
20th-century Maltese people
21st-century Maltese people
Year of birth missing (living people)
Maltese police officers